Robinson Crusoe: Adventures on the Cursed Island is a 2012 storytelling cooperative board game published by Polish company Portal Games and designed by Ignacy Trzewiczek.

Awards 

 2013 Swiss Gamers Award Winner
 2013 Gra Roku Advanced Game of the Year Winner
 2013 Golden Geek Best Thematic Board Game Winner

References

External links 

 

Board games introduced in 2012
Polish board games
Cooperative board games
Robinson Crusoe